Louise Weiss (25 January 1893 – 26 May 1983) was a French author, journalist, feminist and European politician.

Life 
Born in Arras, Pas-de-Calais, Louise Weiss came from a cosmopolitan family of Alsace. Her father, Paul Louis Weiss (1867-1945), a mining engineer, was a distinguished Alsatian Protestant from La Petite-Pierre. The ancestors of her Jewish mother, Jeanne Félicie Javal (1871-1956), originated from the small Alsatian town of Seppois-le-Bas. Her maternal grandfather was Louis Émile Javal. Through her mother she was the niece of Alice Weiller (née Javal) and the cousin of Paul-Louis Weiller, the son of Alice and Lazare Weiller. One of her siblings was Jenny Aubry. She grew up in Paris with five siblings, was trained as a teacher against the will of her family, was a teacher at a secondary school for arts and awarded a degree from Oxford University. From 1914 to 1918, she worked as a war nurse and founded a hospital in the Côtes-du-Nord. From 1918 to 1934, she was the publisher of the magazine, . From 1935 to the beginning of World War II, she committed herself to women's suffrage. In 1936, she stood for French parliamentary elections, running in the Fifth arrondissement of Paris. During the War, she was active in the French Resistance. She claimed she was a member of the Patriam Recuperare network; however this was formally denied by members of the network. She was chief editor of the secret magazine, "Nouvelle République" from 1942 until 1944. She travelled around the Middle East, Japan, China, Vietnam, Africa, Kenya, Madagascar, Alaska, India, etc., made documentary films and wrote accounts of her travels. In 1975, she unsuccessfully tried twice to be admitted to the Académie Française. In 1979, she became a Member of the European Parliament for the Gaullist Party (now The Republicans).

She died on 26 May 1983 in Paris.

Journalist 
During World War I, she published her first press reports under a pseudonym. In Paris, she came in contact with her first great loves, representatives of countries striving for independence, such as Eduard Beneš, Tomáš Masaryk and Milan Štefánik. Between 1919 and 1939, she often travelled to Czechoslovakia. In 1918, she founded the weekly newspaper,  (New Europe), which she published until 1934. Thomas Mann, Gustav Stresemann, Rudolf Breitscheid and Aristide Briand were among her co-authors on the paper. Louise Weiss described those who paved the way for the closening of the German-French relationship between the World Wars as "peace pilgrims", and they called their important co-worker "my good Louise". Europe dreamed of unification and in 1930, she founded the "Ecole de la Paix" (School of Peace), a private institute for international relations. With the takeover by the National Socialists in Germany, the possibility of a unification was over.

Women's rights activist 
In 1934, she founded the association Les femmes nouvelles (The New Woman) with Cécile Brunsvicg, and she strove for a stronger role of women in public life. She participated in campaigns for the right of women to vote in France, organised suffragette commands, demonstrated and had herself chained to a street light in Paris with other women. In 1935, she unsuccessfully sued against the "inability of women to vote" before the French Conseil d'État.

Politician
In 1979, she, a Gaullist, stood as a candidate of the Rassemblement pour la République in the first European election in 1979. On 17 July 1979, she was elected as a French Member of the European Parliament (MEP) and sat with the European People's Party. At the time of the first election, aged 86, she was the oldest member in Parliament and thus its first Oldest Member. She remained MEP and Oldest Member until her death, on 26 May 1983, aged 90.

The main parliament building in Strasbourg bears her name.

Louise Weiss Museum 
A section of the municipal museum of Saverne is dedicated to the life and work of Louise Weiss. It displays the collection of 600 items that she bequeathed to the town in 1981 and 1983, as well as historical documents relating to her career.

Works

Political Works 
 La République Tchécoslovaque, 1919
 Milan Stefanik, Prague 1920

Biographies 
 Souvenirs d'une enfance républicaine, Paris, 1937
 Ce que femme veut, Paris, 1946
 Mémoires d'une Européenne, Paris 1968-1976

Novels 
 Délivrance, Paris 1936
 La Marseillaise, Vol. I and II Paris, 1945; Vol. III Paris 1947
 Sabine Legrand, Paris 1951
 Dernières Voluptés, Paris, 1979

Theatrical Works 
 Arthur ou les joies du suicide
 Sigmaringen ou les potentats du néant
 Le récipiendaire
 La patronne
 Adaptation des Dernières Voluptés

Travel Books 
 L'or, le camion et la croix, Paris, 1949
 Le voyage enchanté, Paris, 1960
 Le Cachemire, Les Albums des Guides Bleus, Paris, 1955

Sociological Essay 
 Lettre à un embryon, Paris 1973

Art, Archaeology and Folklore 
 Contes et légendes du Grand-Nord, Paris, 1957

Honours 
 The main building of the European Parliament in Strasbourg bears her name.
 A street in the 13th arrondissement in Paris is named for her.
 A primary school built by Fritz Beblo in Strasbourg-Neudorf now bears her name.
 Honorary member of the Upper University Council in Strasbourg.
 Winner of the Robert Schuman Prize
 Grand Officer of the Legion of Honor
 Officer of the Order of the White Lion, 1924

Foundation 
Each year, the Louise Weiss Foundation awards a prize to the author or the institution which has contributed the most to the advancement of the science of peace, the improvement of human relations and efforts of benefit to Europe.

References

Literature 
Florence Hervé: Frauengeschichten - Frauengesichter, Vol. 4, trafo verlag 2003, 150 pp., illustrated,

External links
 French biography
 The Louise Weiss Museum in Rohan Castle, Saverne
 
 
 L'Association des Journalistes Européens has organized the Louise Weiss prize for European journalism every year since 2005.
 Vicki Caron, Biography of Louise Weiss, Jewish Women Encyclopedia

1893 births
1983 deaths
European integration pioneers
French feminists
French women journalists
French Resistance members
Grand Officiers of the Légion d'honneur
19th-century French Jews
People from Arras
Union for a Popular Movement MEPs
MEPs for France 1979–1984
20th-century women MEPs for France
French suffragists
20th-century French women writers
20th-century French journalists
Officers of the Order of the White Lion